Aditya Birla Public School is an English medium co-educational middle school situated at Doraguda in the district of Rayagada district.

History
The Aditya Birla Public School, UAIL, Rayagada was inaugurated on July 18, 2011, by the Utkal Alumina International Ltd. The school which started in July 2011 with classes from Play Group to Class V, has added classes from VI to VIII and is affiliated to Central Board of Secondary Education, New Delhi. The school has 370 students.

Communication 
The School is located near Doraguda, which is about 70 km from Rayagada, the Administrative Headquarters of Rayagada District, Odisha i.e. nearly 450 km from the state capital Bhubaneswar. It is connected by Rail to Bhubaneswar, Raipur, Visakhapatnam, Koraput, Kolkata, Chennai, Delhi and Hyderabad. The nearest airport is Vishakhapatnam airport 250 km from Doraguda.

References

External links
 Official website of Rayagada district

Schools in Odisha
Education in Rayagada district
Educational institutions established in 2011
2011 establishments in Odisha